William Shaw was a minister in the Christian Church. He was born in Barton-upon-Humber, Lincolnshire, England and founded the town of Barton, Maryland in the United States in 1794.

The Shaw Mansion, on Laurel Run Road in Barton, is on the National Register of Historic Properties.  It was built in 1872 by the son of Willam Shaw, Andrew Shaw.

References

Allegany County, Maryland
Georges Creek Valley
People from Barton-upon-Humber
Religious leaders from Cumberland, Maryland
18th-century Christian clergy
English emigrants to the United States
18th-century American clergy